White Hall Plantation House Ruins and Oak Avenue is a historic plantation site located near Ridgeland, Jasper County, South Carolina.  The site consists of the ruins of a brick house with tabby wings and twin tabby flanking outbuildings; a tabby retaining wall; and a massive double avenue of oaks planted in the late-18th or early-19th century. The plantation house was built between 1771 and 1776, then enlarged between 1786 and 1791. The house at White Hall burned about 1870 and was not renovated or occupied afterward.

It was added to the National Register of Historic Places in 2000.

References

Archaeological sites on the National Register of Historic Places in South Carolina
Buildings and structures in Jasper County, South Carolina
National Register of Historic Places in Jasper County, South Carolina
Tabby buildings
Ruins in the United States